Taira is a genus of East Asian tangled nest spiders first described by Pekka T. Lehtinen in 1967.

Species
 it contains seventeen species:
Taira borneoensis Zhao, Wang, Irfan & Zhang, 2021 — Malaysia (Borneo)
Taira cangshan Zhang, Zhu & Song, 2008 — China
Taira concava Zhang, Zhu & Song, 2008 — China
Taira decorata (Yin & Bao, 2001) — China
Taira flavidorsalis (Yaginuma, 1964) — China, Japan
Taira gyaisiensis Zhao, Wang, Irfan & Zhang, 2021 — China
Taira latilabiata Zhang, Zhu & Song, 2008 — China
Taira liboensis Zhu, Chen & Zhang, 2004 — China
Taira nyagqukaensis Zhao, Wang, Irfan & Zhang, 2021 — China
Taira obtusa Zhang, Zhu & Song, 2008 — China
Taira qiuae Wang, Jäger & Zhang, 2010 — China
Taira sichuanensis Wang, Jäger & Zhang, 2010 — China
Taira sulciformis Zhang, Zhu & Song, 2008 — China
Taira wanzhouensis Zhao, Wang, Irfan & Zhang, 2021 — China
Taira xuanenensis Zhao, Wang, Irfan & Zhang, 2021 — China
Taira yangi Zhao, Wang, Irfan & Zhang, 2021 — China
Taira zhui Wang, Jäger & Zhang, 2010 — China

References

Amaurobiidae
Araneomorphae genera
Taxa named by Pekka T. Lehtinen